Tomislav "Tomica" Kocijan (born 21 November 1967, in Varaždin) is a former Austria international football player and current manager.

Club career
He finished his career in the Austrian lower leagues.

International career
He made his debut for Austria in a September 2000 friendly match against Iran and earned a total of 4 caps, scoring 1 goal. His final international was an October 2001 World Cup qualification match away against Israel.

References

External links
 
 

1967 births
Living people
Sportspeople from Varaždin
Austrian people of Croatian descent
Naturalised citizens of Austria
Association football forwards
Yugoslav footballers
Austrian footballers
Austria international footballers
NK Varaždin players
Favoritner AC players
SK Vorwärts Steyr players
FC Red Bull Salzburg players
SK Sturm Graz players
LASK players
Austrian Regionalliga players
Austrian Football Bundesliga players
2. Liga (Austria) players
Austrian Landesliga players
Austrian 2. Landesliga players
Croatian football managers
Austrian football managers
NK Varaždin managers